Guy François (18 September 1947 – 3 June 2019) was a Haitian football midfielder who played for Haiti in the 1974 FIFA World Cup. He also played for Violette A.C.

References

External links
FIFA profile

1947 births
2019 deaths
Haitian footballers
Haiti international footballers
Association football midfielders
Violette AC players
Ligue Haïtienne players
1974 FIFA World Cup players
CONCACAF Championship-winning players
Haitian emigrants to Canada